The American Rabbit Breeders Association (ARBA) is a national club for domestic rabbit and cavy breeders. The ARBA is headquartered in Knox, Pennsylvania in the United States. Its membership is composed of rabbit and cavy breeders throughout, fanciers, and pet owners in North America and many countries throughout the world.

The ARBA serves to promote the domestic rabbit and cavy fancy, as well as commercial rabbit production. The American Rabbit Breeders Association sets official breed standards for recognized rabbit breeds and cavy breeds. Every five years the ARBA publishes a detailed guide entitled Standard of Perfection. This guide is beneficial to rabbit and cavy (guinea pig) breeders, providing a reference to those interested in understanding the conformation standard for the variety of breeds recognized by the ARBA. ARBA recognizes 50 breeds of rabbit and 13 cavy breeds.

Rabbit shows
The ARBA sanctions rabbit shows throughout the year, all over the USA and Canada. These shows, sponsored by local clubs, fairs, and show circuits, give rabbit and cavy fanciers the chance to have their animals examined by educated judges and compared to other breeders' animals and the standard. The ARBA holds a large national convention show once a year, which draws in fanciers from across the country and around the world. The 2005 ARBA convention was documented in the film Rabbit Fever. The 2006 ARBA Convention was held in Ft. Worth, Texas, the 2007 ARBA Convention was held in Grand Rapids, Michigan, 2008 in Louisville, Kentucky, 2009 in San Diego, California, 2010 in Minneapolis, Minnesota, 2011 in Indianapolis, Indiana, 2012 in Wichita, Kansas, 2013 in Harrisburg, Pennsylvania, 2014 in Ft. Worth, Texas, 2015 in Portland, Oregon, 2016 in San Diego, California, 2017 in Indianapolis, Indiana, 2018 in West Springfield, Massachusetts, 2019 in Reno, Nevada, 2020 in Harrisburg, Pennsylvania, and 2021 in Louisville, Kentucky .

Rabbit raising education
This organization helps all levels of rabbit keepers and breeders, including 4-H participants to fanciers, pet owners to commercial producers. The ARBA also produces educational materials such as a guide book, 'Raising Better Rabbits & Cavies', as well as informative books on each registered breed, and a poster with photographs of the recognized breeds of rabbits and cavies, and rabbit registrar and judge training materials. The judges education program is an ongoing program for established judges.

Unified judging and registration system
The ARBA has a standardized judging system in which rabbits are judged against the respective breed standard, set by a 100-point scale, and published in the Standard of Perfection. It is a book detailing all of the recognized breeds in the United States and their attributes. The association has licensed judges since the early 1900s who may judge at sanctioned shows and fairs. The registration system maintains records on all rabbits which have passed a registration examination to ensure the animals are healthy and meet the ARBA Standard for the rabbits' breed. ARBA licensed registrars conduct the examination. Registrations are ranked Red, White and Blue to distinguish how many ancestors of the subject rabbit have been previously registered.

ARBA Library and Hall of Fame
The ARBA Library, located at the headquarters in Knox, Pennsylvania, houses the world's largest single repository of books and writings on domestic rabbits. It is an archival library, not a lending library. It holds over 10,000 items/pieces, which are housed in the collection, and it continues to constantly grow. The next largest similar collection is at the United States National Agricultural Library in Maryland, and it holds about 1,300 pieces. The British National Library, London also has an extensive collection. Access to the Library for research by members is available by appointment only.

ARBA Youth Scholarship
The ARBA offers a Youth Scholarship program for high school graduates who wish to further their education. The recipients must have graduated with a minimum 3.0 grade point average and be enrolled in their first year of higher education. The scholarship proceeds are designated to be used towards two- or four-year college, vocational, or technical school.

See also
Cuniculture

References

External links

The ARBA website for youth breeders webpage

Breeder organizations